Aleida Alavez Ruiz (born 10 January 1974) is a Mexican politician affiliated with Morena. She currently serves as Deputy of the LXV Legislature of the Mexican Congress representing Mexico City. She also served as Deputy during the LX, LXII, and LXIV Legislatures, the first two times as a member of the Party of the Democratic Revolution.

References

1974 births
Living people
Politicians from Mexico City
Women members of the Chamber of Deputies (Mexico)
Deputies of the LXIV Legislature of Mexico
Deputies of the LXV Legislature of Mexico
Party of the Democratic Revolution politicians
21st-century Mexican politicians
21st-century Mexican women politicians
National Autonomous University of Mexico alumni
Members of the Congress of Mexico City
Members of the Chamber of Deputies (Mexico) for Mexico City
Deputies of the LXII Legislature of Mexico
Deputies of the LX Legislature of Mexico
Morena (political party) politicians